The  Miss Washington USA competition is the pageant that selects the representative for the state of Washington in the Miss USA pageant. It is currently produced by Pageants NW Productions based in Puyallup, Washington, which also produces Idaho, Montana and Oregon state pageants.

Washington has been moderately successful in terms of number of semi-finalists and placements, and has had one Miss USA.  Dorothy Anstett won the crown in 1968 and went on to place 4th runner-up at Miss Universe. The most recent placement was Tara McCormick in 2004, placing Top 15.

Prior to 2017, no Washington delegate had previously competed at Miss Teen USA, although one has competed at Miss America. Alex Carlson-Helo, Miss Washington Teen USA 2012, became the last state to have made her the first Teen to Miss crossover for the state.

Samantha Gallia of Sacramento, California, residing in Seattle, was crowned Miss Washington USA 2023 on November 13, 2022 at Renton IKEA Performing Arts Center in Renton, Washington. She will represent Washington for the title of Miss USA 2023.

Results summary
Miss USA: Dorothy Anstett (1968)
1st runners-up: Tracey Goddard (1979)
3rd runners-up: Nancy Petraborg (1953)
Top 10/12: Norene Gilbert (1976), Kathi Tucker (1983), Natasha Vantramp (1998)
Top 15: Shirley Givins (1955), June Svedin (1956), Diana Schafer (1957), Rose Nielsen (1958), Deborah Gieberson (1969), Susan Hyde (1970), Tara McCormick (2004)
Washington holds a record of 13 Placements at Miss USA.

Awards
Miss Congeniality: Breann Parriott (2003), Imani Blackmon (2020)

Winners 

Color key

References

External links
Official website

Washington
Miss Washington USA winners
Washington (state) culture
Women in Washington (state)
Recurring events established in 1952
1952 establishments in Washington (state)
Annual events in Washington (state)